Dunnington is a village in the East Riding of Yorkshire, England.

It forms part of the civil parish of Bewholme.

References

External links

Villages in the East Riding of Yorkshire